Marion Harris (born Mary Ellen Harrison; April 4, 1896 – April 23, 1944) was an American popular singer who was most successful in the late 1910s and the 1920s. She was the first widely known white singer to sing jazz and blues songs.

Early life
She was born Mary Ellen Harrison on April 4, 1896, probably in Indiana. She sang in vaudeville and movie theaters in Chicago around 1914. The dancer Vernon Castle introduced her to the theater community in New York City, where she debuted in the Irving Berlin revue Stop! Look! Listen! in 1915.

Recordings
In 1916, she began recording for Victor Records, singing a variety of songs, such as "Everybody's Crazy 'bout the Doggone Blues, but I'm Happy", "After You've Gone", "A Good Man Is Hard to Find", "When I Hear That Jazz Band Play" and her biggest success, "I Ain't Got Nobody" (originally titled "I Ain't Got Nobody Much").

In 1920, after Victor prevented her from recording W.C. Handy's "St. Louis Blues", she joined Columbia, where she recorded the song. Sometimes billed as "The Queen of the Blues", she recorded blues and jazz songs throughout her career. Handy wrote, "she sang blues so well that people hearing her records sometimes thought that the singer was colored." Harris commented, "You usually do best what comes naturally, so I just naturally started singing Southern dialect songs and the modern blues songs."

She was briefly married to the actor Robert Williams. They married in 1921 and divorced the following year. Harris and Williams had one daughter, Mary Ellen, who later became a singer under the name Marion Harris Jr.

In 1922 she signed with Brunswick. She continued to appear in Broadway theatres throughout the 1920s. She regularly played the Palace Theatre, appeared in Florenz Ziegfeld's Midnight Frolic, and toured the country with vaudeville shows. After her divorce from a marriage that produced two children, she returned, in 1927, to New York theater, made more recordings with Victor and appeared in an eight-minute Vitaphone short film, Marion Harris: Songbird of Jazz. After performing in a Hollywood movie, the early musical Devil-May-Care (1929), with Ramón Novarro, she temporarily withdrew from performance because of an undisclosed illness.

Later career and death
Between 1931 and 1933, Harris performed on such NBC radio shows as The Ipana Troubadors and Rudy Vallee's The Fleischmann's Yeast Hour. She was billed by NBC as "The Little Girl with the Big Voice."

In early 1931 she performed in London, returning for long engagements at the Café de Paris (located in London). In London, she appeared in the musical Ever Green and broadcast on BBC radio. She also recorded in England in the early 1930s but retired soon afterward. In 1936, she married Leonard Urry, an English theatrical agent. Their house was destroyed in a German bombing attack in 1941, and in 1944 she travelled to New York to seek treatment for a neurological disorder. She was discharged two months later.

She died on April 23, 1944, at Le Marquise Hotel from a fire that started when she fell asleep while smoking in bed.

Discography
 The Complete Victor Releases (Archeophone, 2000)
 Look for the Silver Lining (Living Era, 2006)

Hit singles

Notes

References

External links

 Marion Harris at The Jazz Age

The Complete Marion Harris at the Internet Archive
 Marion Harris recordings at the Discography of American Historical Recordings.

1896 births
1944 deaths
20th-century American women singers
American blues singers
American women jazz singers
American jazz singers
American women pop singers
Singers from Indiana
Vaudeville performers
Burials at Kensico Cemetery
Deaths from fire in the United States
20th-century American singers